Vyborg, in Finland until 1940, and since then in Russia, had an electric tramway network from 1912 to 1957.

See also 

 History of rail transport in Finland
 History of rail transport in Russia
 List of town tramway systems in Europe
 Trams in Finland
 Rail transport in Finland
 Rail transport in Russia

External links

 Finnish Tramway Society - official website 

Transport in Vyborg
Vyborg
Vyborg
Vyborg